The Distinguished Flying Cross (DFC) is a military decoration of the United States Armed Forces. The medal was established on July 2, 1926, and is currently awarded to any persons who, after April 6, 1917, distinguish themselves by single acts of heroism or extraordinary achievement while participating in aerial flight. Both heroism and extraordinary achievement are entirely distinctive, involving operations that are not routine. The medal may be awarded to friendly foreign military members in ranks equivalent to U.S. Pay Grade of O-6 and below, in actual combat in support operations.

History

On June 14, 2017, the 242nd birthday of the Army, Byron Derringer's efforts over a number of years to have his great-grandfather, 95th Aero Squadron Commander and Army Captain James Ely Miller, recognized for the Distinguished Flying Cross (DFC) were successful. Miller, the first American aviator killed in action during World War I, received the DFC posthumously and is now the first and only recipient to have received it for its intended purpose. This achievement resulted in a change to the history of the award.

The first award of the Distinguished Flying Cross was made by President Calvin Coolidge on May 2, 1927, to ten aviators of the U.S. Army Air Corps who had participated in the Army Pan American Flight which took place from December 21, 1926, to May 2, 1927. Two of the airmen died in a mid-air collision trying to land at Buenos Aires on February 26, 1927, and received their awards posthumously. The award had only been authorized by Congress the previous year and no medals had yet been struck, so the Pan American airmen initially received only certificates. Among the ten airmen were Major Herbert Dargue, Captains Ira C. Eaker and Muir S. Fairchild, and First Lieutenant Ennis C. Whitehead.

Charles Lindbergh received the first presentation of the actual medal about a month later from Coolidge during the Washington, D.C., homecoming reception on June 11, 1927, from his trans-Atlantic flight. The medal had hurriedly been struck and readied just for that occasion.  The 1927 War Department General Order (G.O. 8) authorizing Lindbergh's DFC states that it was awarded by the president, while the General Order (G.O. 6) for the Pan American Flyers' DFC citation notes that the War Department awarded it "by direction of the President." The first Distinguished Flying Cross to be awarded to a Naval aviator was received by Commander Richard E. Byrd, USN for his trans-Atlantic flight from June 29 to July 1, 1927, from New York City to the coast of France. Byrd and his pilot Machinist Floyd Bennett had already received the Medal of Honor for their historic flight to the North Pole on May 9, 1926.

Numerous recipients of the medal earned greater fame in other occupations; a number of astronauts, actors, and politicians have been Distinguished Flying Cross recipients, including President George H. W. Bush. The DFC may be retroactively awarded to recognize notable accomplishments made at any time after the beginning of American participation in World War I. On February 23, 1929, Congress passed special legislation to allow the award of the DFC to the Wright brothers for their December 17, 1903, flight. Other civilians who have received the award include Wiley Post, Jacqueline Cochran, Roscoe Turner, Amelia Earhart, Glenn H. Curtiss, and Eugene Ely. Eventually, it was limited to military personnel by an Executive Order. Amelia Earhart became the first woman to receive the DFC on July 29, 1932, when it was presented to her by Vice President Charles Curtis in Los Angeles for her solo flight across the Atlantic Ocean earlier that year.

World War I
First And Only DFC Received For Which It Was Originally Intended

95th Aero Squadron Commander and Army Capt. James E. Miller, one of the first aviators in the U.S. military and the first U.S. aviation casualty in World War I, has been named recipient of the Distinguished Flying Cross nearly 100 years after his heroic actions over France in 1918. On the 242nd birthday of the Army, during a twilight tattoo ceremony at Joint Base Myer-Henderson Hall, Virginia, Acting Secretary of the Army Robert M. Speer presented the Distinguished Flying Cross to Miller's great-grandson, Byron Derringer. “We're very proud today to have some of the descendants from James Miller's family here and able to represent him and a lineage of what he achieved on those battlefields as the first individual who gave his life in that war in aviation," Speer said. The presentation of the cross to a World War I soldier is significant, given that the theme for this year's Army birthday is, "Over There! A Celebration of the World War I Soldier."

==

There are two historically significant aspects to the long overdue presentation of awards to the family and survivors of Capt. James Ely Miller. At the time of his death on 9 March 1918, Capt. Miller was serving as commanding officer of the 95th Aero Squadron, 1st Pursuit Group, American Expeditionary Force (A.E.F), when his SPAD S.VII.C.I was shot down behind enemy lines while engaged in aerial combat with four German biplanes in the vicinity of Corbeny, France. As we approach nearly the centennial anniversary of the A.E.F.’s deployment and engagement in active combat operations, the historical significance of Capt. Miller's valor and heroism take on a much larger role.

Distinguished Flying Cross

The Distinguished Flying Cross was established by Act of Congress in 1926 to honor the valor and heroism of WW I aviators. The first medal was presented to Charles Lindbergh on June 11, 1927, by the President Calvin Coolidge. The Distinguished Flying Cross Society, supported by research from the National World War I museum in Kansas City, MO can find no occasion of a WW I pilot actually receiving the award.

Therefore, the presentation of the award to Capt. James Ely Miller would be the first occasion of the Distinguished Flying Cross actually being presented to a recipient for which it was originally intended. 

Purple Heart

The Purple Heart originally conceived as a Badge of Military Merit and established by George Washington on August 7, 1782, was modified to replace Wound Chevrons subsequent to April 5, 1917, by G.O. No. 3 on February 22, 1932. Today the purple heart is awarded to any member of the Armed Services, after April 5, 1917, who has been wounded or killed in any action against an enemy of the United States.

Capt. James Ely Miller, by his sacrifice, became the first U.S. airman eligible for the Purple Heart to die in air-to-air combat against an enemy, while serving in an armed force of the United States. 

==

Captain Ely Miller is an American World War I aviation hero whose story of valor and sacrifice is truly unique.  He posthumously received the very first Distinguished Flying Cross (DFC) ever being presented to a recipient from World War I, for which the award was originally intended.  Additionally, Miller, by his sacrifice, became the first U.S. airman, eligible for the Purple Heart, to die in air-to-air combat against any enemy, while serving in the Armed Forces of the United States.

Captain Miller died in the worldwide fight for humanity and civilization. He unhesitatingly and fearlessly exposed himself to enemy planes and heroically volunteered his efforts to defend this great nation.

==

Captain James Ely Miller American Legion Post 833

Miller Field, New Dorp Ln, Staten Island, NY

American Legion

Gale Academic Onefile

This Day in Aviation - Important Dates in Aviation History

The Distinguished Flying Cross Society - DFC Society News Magazine Article, Member Spotlight - Captain James Ely Miller, by J. Bruce Huffman

The Times of Smithtown, American Legion James Ely Miller Post Celebrates its 100th Anniversary, Community News pg A8

Daedalus Flyer, Long Due Tribute Rendered, Fall 2017, pgs 6–8, Author Bruce Huffman, Submitted by Chuck Sweeney

Aviation History Magazine, America's Only World War I DFC, The First U.S. Army Air Service Pilot to Die in Combat Received a Posthumous Distinguished Flying Cross - 99 Years After He Was Killed, September 2018 pg, 12, 14, by Jon Guttman

The United States World War One Centennial Commission

The United States Army, First Fallen Aviator of World War I Honored with Distinguished Flying Cross

The United States Department of Defense, Fallen World War I Aviator Gets Posthumous Distinguished Flying Cross

The Distinguished Flying Cross Society, DFC Society Makes 100 Year Connection - A Legacy from WWI to WWII to Today

World War II
During World War II, the medal's award criteria varied widely depending on the theater of operations, aerial combat that was engaged in, and the missions that were accomplished. In the Pacific, commissioned officers were often awarded the DFC, while enlisted men were given the Air Medal. In Europe, some crews received it for their overall performance through a tour of duty. The criteria used were however not consistent between commands or over time. Individual achievement could also result in the medal being awarded. For example, George McGovern received one for the successful completion of a bombing mission in which his aircraft lost an engine and then was landed safely. On December 28, 1944, Aleda Lutz became the first military woman to receive the DFC, which she received posthumously.

Criteria
The Distinguished Flying Cross was authorized by Section 12 of the United States Army Air Corps Act enacted by Congress on July 2, 1926, as amended by Executive Order 7786 on January 8, 1938 and USC 10, 9279. This act provided for the award to be given to any person who distinguishes themselves "by heroism or extraordinary achievement while participating in an aerial flight" while serving in any capacity with the Air Corps.

Appearance
The Distinguished Flying Cross was designed by Elizabeth Will and Arthur E. DuBois. The medal is a bronze cross pattee, on whose obverse is superimposed a four-bladed propeller, 1 11/16 inches in width. Five rays extend from the reentrant angles, forming a one-inch square. The reverse is blank; it is suitable for engraving the recipient's name and rank. The cross is suspended from a rectangular bar.

The suspension and service ribbon of the medal is 1 3/8 inches wide and consists of the following stripes: 3/32 inch Ultramarine Blue 67118; 9/64 inch White 67101; 11/32 inch Ultramarine Blue 67118; 3/64 inch White 67101; center stripe 3/32 inch Old Glory Red 67156; 3/64 inch White 67101; 11/32 inch Ultramarine Blue 67118; 9/64 inch White 67101; 3/32 inch Ultramarine Blue 67118.

Devices

Additional awards of the Distinguished Flying Cross are shown with bronze or silver Oak Leaf Clusters for the Army, Air Force, and Space Force, and gold and silver  Inch Stars for the Navy, Marine Corps, and Coast Guard.

The Army, Air Force, Space Force, Navy, and Marine Corps may authorize the "V" device for wear on the DFC to denote valor in combat. The services can also award the DFC for extraordinary achievement without the "V" device.

On January 7, 2016, a Secretary of Defense memorandum standardized the use of the "V" device as a valor-only device across the services. The Department of Defense published "DOD Manuals 1348.33, Volumes 1-4, DOD Military Decorations and Awards" which unified the criteria for awards. DOD 1348.33.  "Army Regulation 600-8-22, Military Awards" authorizes use of the "V" Device with the DFC for combat valor and the "C" Device for meritorious service or achievement under combat conditions.

DFC National Memorial Act
In July 2014, the United States Senate passed the Distinguished Flying Cross National Memorial Act.  The act was sponsored by Senator Barbara Boxer, to designate the Distinguished Flying Cross Memorial at March Field Air Museum adjacent to March Air Reserve Base in Riverside, California, as a national memorial to recognize members of United States Armed Forces who have distinguished themselves by heroism in aerial flight.  The act was signed into law by President Barack Obama on July 25, 2014.

Notable recipients of the DFC
Note: the rank indicated is the highest held by the individual.

Astronauts
 Lieutenant General Thomas P. Stafford, USAF: flew to the Moon on Apollo 10, commander of the Apollo–Soyuz mission. 
 Major General Michael Collins, USAF: command module pilot for Apollo 11 mission to the Moon.
 Major General Joe Engle, USAF: X-15 and Space Shuttle pilot.
 Rear Admiral Alan Shepard, USN: one of the original seven American astronauts, first American in space in Freedom 7, commanded Apollo 14.
 Brigadier General James McDivitt, USAF: commander of Gemini 4 and Apollo 9.
 Colonel Buzz Aldrin, USAF: Lunar Module pilot for Apollo 11, second man to walk on the Moon.
 Colonel Frank Borman, USAF: commander of Apollo 8.
 Colonel Eileen Collins, USAF: first woman to command a space shuttle mission.
 Colonel Gordon Cooper, USAF: one of the original seven American astronauts, pilot of Faith 7 and commander of Gemini 5.
 Colonel Guy Gardner: Space Shuttle pilot and recipient of three DFCs.
 Colonel John Glenn, USMC: (5 awards) One of the original seven American astronauts, first American to orbit the earth in Friendship 7 and United States Senator.
 Colonel David Scott, USAF: flew on Gemini 8, Apollo 9 and Apollo 15.
 Captain Eugene Cernan, USN: pilot of Gemini 9A, lunar module pilot of Apollo 10 and commander of Apollo 17. One of only 3 persons to have flown to the Moon twice. 
 Captain Pete Conrad, USN: commander of Apollo 12 and Skylab 2.
 Captain Robert Crippen, USN: pilot on first space shuttle mission.
 Captain Mark Kelly, USN: pilot on four space shuttle missions, commander for two, including the final mission of Space Shuttle Endeavour, and recipient of 2 DFCs.
 Captain Scott Kelly, USN: Lived for one year on the International Space Station.
 Captain Jim Lovell, USN: pilot of Gemini 7, Commander of Gemini 12, Command Module Pilot of Apollo 8, and Commander of Apollo 13. 
 Captain Wally Schirra, USN: one of the original seven American astronauts flew on Sigma 7, Gemini 6A and as commander of Apollo 7.
 Captain John Young, USN: flew on Apollo 10 and Apollo 16, commander of the first space shuttle mission.
 Lieutenant Colonel Duane Carey, USAF: Space Shuttle pilot. Awarded with Valor Device.
 Lieutenant Colonel Gus Grissom, USAF: one of the original seven American astronauts, second American in space on Liberty Bell 7.
 Commander Scott Carpenter, USN: one of the original seven American astronauts, flew on Aurora 7, and aquanaut with SEALAB project.
 Major Deke Slayton, USAF: one of the original seven American astronauts, NASA chief astronaut and docking module pilot for the Apollo–Soyuz mission.

Note: Although astronaut Neil Armstrong's achievements as an aviator and an astronaut more than exceeded the requirements for the DFC, he was a civilian for his entire career with NASA, requiring an act of Congress to award the medal.

Political figures
 Lieutenant George H. W. Bush, USNR: President of the United States.
 Major General Patrick J. Hurley, USAR: Secretary of War.
 Rear Admiral Jeremiah Denton, USN: US Senator.
 Brigadier General Joe Foss, ANG: Medal of Honor recipient and Governor of South Dakota.
 Colonel Bruce Sundlun, USAFR: Governor of Rhode Island.
 Colonel Lloyd Bentsen, USAFR: US Senator, Secretary of the Treasury, and vice presidential candidate.
 Colonel Alexander Butterfield, USAF: aide to President Richard Nixon.
 Captain John S. McCain, III, USN: US Senator and presidential candidate.
 Captain Jim Wright, USAAF: Speaker of the US House of Representatives.
 Captain Bruce Alger, USAAF: US Representative.
 Captain Peter H. Dominick, USAAF: US Senator.
 Captain William Hathaway, USAAF: US Senator.
 Captain Joseph McCarthy, USMC: US Senator.
 Captain Gentner Drummond, USAF: Attorney General of Oklahoma.
 First Lieutenant George McGovern, USAAF: US Senator, presidential candidate.
 First Lieutenant Ted Stevens, USAAF: US Senator.
 First Lieutenant Richard Harding Poff, USAAF: US Representative.
 First Lieutenant John Ehrlichman, USAAF: aide to President Richard Nixon.
 First Lieutenant Brendan Byrne, USAAC: Governor of New Jersey.

Civilians
 Glenn Curtiss: aircraft designer. Posthumously awarded in 1933. 
 Amelia Earhart: legendary aviatrix. First woman to receive the DFC by an act of Congress in 1932.
 Eugene Burton Ely: first person to make a ship-board landing in an aircraft.  Posthumously awarded in 1933.
 Harold Gatty: Navigator with Wiley Post on record-breaking around the world flight.  Awarded in 1932.
 Wiley Post: completed record-breaking around-the-world flight and was the first person to fly solo around the world.  Awarded in 1932.
 Roscoe Turner: flamboyant air racing champion.  Presented in 1952.  (Last award of the DFC to a civilian.)
 Orville Wright: aviation pioneer.  Awarded by Act of Congress on December 18, 1928.
 Wilbur Wright: aviation pioneer.  Posthumously awarded by Act of Congress on December 18, 1928.

Foreign citizens
 Wing Commander James Blackburn RAF: distinguished British pilot during World War II.
 Wing Commander A. Warburton, RAF: distinguished British reconnaissance pilot during World War II.
 Squadron Leader Robert Stanford Tuck, RAF: distinguished British pilot and flying ace during World War II
 Colonel Francesco De Pinedo: Regia Aeronautica: completed the Four Continents Flight in a flying boat in 1927.
 Lieutenant Colonel Dieudonné Costes: French Army: completed around the world flight.
 Lieutenant Commander Joseph Le Brix: French Navy: completed around the world flight.
 Commandant James Fitzmaurice: Irish Air Corps. Flew on first non-stop westward crossing of the Atlantic Ocean on the Bremen.
 Major Arthur Chin, Republic of China Air Force: Chinese-American fighter ace.
 Captain Hermann Köhl: German Army: flew on first non-stop westward crossing of the Atlantic Ocean.
 Baron Ehrenfried Günther Freiherr von Hünefeld: German aristocrat: flew on first non-stop westward crossing of the Atlantic Ocean.

Celebrities
 Brigadier General James Stewart, USAFR: World War II B-24 pilot and Group Operations Officer.  Academy Award-winning actor.
 Brigadier General Chuck Yeager, USAF: test pilot and first human to break the sound barrier.
 Lieutenant Colonel Jerry Coleman, USMC: World War II and Korean War pilot. Second baseman for the New York Yankees and long-time broadcaster for the San Diego Padres.
 Major Clark Gable, USAAF: Star of Gone with the Wind who flew on five bombing missions during World War II.
 Major Wolfgang Reitherman, USAAF: World War pilot. Animator, director and producer for Disney animated movies.
 Captain Don Herbert, USAAF: World War II B-24 pilot. Creator and host of the Watch Mr. Wizard and Mr. Wizard's World television programs. 
 Captain Gene Roddenberry, USAAF: Creator of the Star Trek television series and franchise.
 Captain Dan Rowan, USAAF: P-40 Warhawk pilot and star of Laugh In.
 Captain Cal Worthington, USAAF: Legendary car salesman.
 First Lieutenant Jack Valente, USAAF: Longtime president of the Motion Picture Association of America.
 Corporal Sabu Dastagir, USAAF: Indian-American actor who served as a B-24 tail gunner during World War II.

United States Air Force, Army Air Forces, and Army Air Corps
 General of the Air Force Henry H. Arnold, USAF: commander of the US Army Air Forces during World War II.
 General Samuel E. Anderson, USAF: commander of the 5th Air Force during the Korean War.
 General Jimmy Doolittle, USAF: leader of the Doolittle Raid.
 General Leon W. Johnson, USAF: leader in the Ploesti Raid and commander of the Continental Air Command.
 General George S. Brown, USAF: Chairman of the Joint Chiefs of Staff.
 General Ira C. Eaker, USAF: commander of the 8th Air Force during World War II.
 General Charles A. Gabriel, USAF: Chief of Staff or the U.S. Air Force, recipient of five DFCs.
 General Daniel James Jr., USAF: first African-American US Air Force four-star general.
 General David C. Jones, USAF: Chairman of the Joint Chiefs of Staff.
 General George C. Kenney, USAF: first commander of Strategic Air Command.
 General Curtis Lemay, USAF: Air Force Chief of Staff and vice presidential candidate.
 General Seth J. McKee, USAF: NORAD commander and D-Day veteran.
 General John C. Meyer, USAF: commander of Strategic Air Command. Seven DFCs
 General Richard B. Myers, USAF: Chairman of the Joint Chiefs of Staff.
 General Joseph W. Ralston, USAF: Supreme Allied Commander for NATO.
 General Carl Spaatz, USAF: first Chief of Staff of the United States Air Force.
 General Nathan F. Twining, USAF: Chairman of the Joint Chiefs of Staff.
 Lieutenant General Frank Maxwell Andrews, USAAF: died in accident in 1943.
 Lieutenant General Royal N. Baker, USAF: flew combat missions in World War II, Korea and Vietnam.
 Lieutenant General Lewis H. Brereton, USAF: commander of the Ninth Air Force during World War II.
 Lieutenant General George H. Brett, USAF: commander of the Caribbean Defense Command in World War II.
 Lieutenant General Claire Lee Chennault, USAF: commander of the Flying Tigers.
 Lieutenant General Benjamin O. Davis Jr., USAF: first African-American US Air Force general.
 Lieutenant General Robert E. Kelley, USAF: Vietnam War combat pilot and USAFA Superintendent.
 Lieutenant General Elwood Richard Quesada, USAF: first commander of Tactical Air Command.
 Lieutenant General George E. Stratemeyer, USAF: commander of Far East Air Forces during the Korean War.
 Major General Orvil A. Anderson, USAF: participant in altitude record setting Air Corps Stratospheric Balloon Flights in Explorer I and Explorer II in 1934 and 1935.
 Major General David M. Jones, USAF: Doolittle Raider and recipient of two DFCs.
 Major General Uzal Girard Ent, USAAF: leader of the Ploesti Raid.
 Major General Caleb V. Haynes, USAF: bomber commander of the China Air Task Force.
 Major General Frank O'Driscoll Hunter, USAAF
 Major General Robert Olds, USAAF: father of ace Robin Olds.
 Major General Robert A. Rushworth, USAF: X-15 pilot.
 Major General Clarence A. Shoop, USAAF: WWII observation pilot
 Major General Mele "Mel" Vojvodich, USAF: pilot for the CIA in Vietnam, three DFCs.
 Brigadier General Frederick Walker Castle, USAAF: four DFCs.
 Brigadier General E. Daniel Cherry, USAF: ten DFCs.
 Brigadier General Gerald Goodfellow, USAF: B1-Lancer offensive systems officer, awarded the Distinguished Flying Cross for action during Operation Allied Force.
 Brigadier General Charles A. Lindbergh, USAFR: first person to fly solo across the Atlantic Ocean.
 Brigadier General Robin Olds, USAF: combat pilot in World War II and Vietnam War and recipient of six DFCs.
 Brigadier General Richard Stephen Ritchie, USAF: only US Air Force ace of the Vietnam War, with five kills.
 Brigadier General Elliott Roosevelt, USAAF: son of President Franklin Roosevelt.
 Brigadier General Robert Lee Scott Jr., USAF: fighter pilot who earned three DFCs.
 Brigadier General Dale E. Stovall, USAF: Vietnam War CSAR pilot who rescued Roger Locher, deepest rescue inside North Vietnam.
 Brigadier General Kenneth M. Taylor, USAF: one of the few American fighter pilots to get airborne during the attack on Pearl Harbor.
 Brigadier General Paul Tibbets, USAF: pilot of the Enola Gay.
 Colonel Bernt Balchen, USAF: pilot of first plane to fly over the South Pole.
 Colonel Kim Campbell, USAF: for successfully completing her mission supporting ground troops over Baghdad in April 2003 and successfully landing her A-10 back at base despite sustaining severe damage to her aircraft.
 Colonel Jacqueline Cochran, USAFR: multiple record setting aviatrix, first woman to break the sound barrier and commander of the Women Airforce Service Pilots (WASPs) during World War II.
 Colonel George Day, USAF: POW during the Vietnam War.
 Colonel Merlyn Hans Dethlefsen, USAF: Vietnam War F-105 pilot.
 Colonel Bernard F. Fisher, USAF: Vietnam War A-1 Skyraider pilot.
 Colonel James P. Fleming, USAF: Vietnam War helicopter pilot.
 Colonel Joe M. Jackson, USAF: combat veteran of World War II, the Korean War and the Vietnam War.
 Colonel John R. Kane, USAF: leader in the Ploesti Raid.
 Colonel Gabby Gabreski, USAF: highest scoring American ace in the European Theater with 34 kills.  Recipient of 13 DFCs.
 Colonel Jose L. Holguin, USAF:  Silver Star recipient and POW during World War II.
 Colonel James K. Johnson, USAF: Korean war ace with 11 kills.  Recipient of three DFCs.
 Colonel Charles H. MacDonald, USAF: recipient of six DFCs.
 Colonel Ashley Chadbourne McKinley, USAF: Photographer on first flight over the South Pole.
 Colonel Russell Maughan, USAAF: completed first "dawn to dusk" transcontinental flight.
 Colonel David C. Schilling, USAF: recipient of 11 DFCs.
 Colonel Lowell Smith, USAAF: conducted first aerial refueling and commanded first aerial circumnavigation of the globe.
 Colonel Robert E. Thacker, USAF: pilot of record-breaking flight from Honolulu to New York and recipient of three DFCs.
 Colonel Leo K. Thorsness, USAF: Medal of Honor recipient and Vietnam War veteran.
 Lieutenant Colonel Lee Archer, USAF: first African-American fighter ace.
 Lieutenant Colonel Leaford Bearskin, USAF: veteran of World War II and Korea and also Chief of the Wyandotte Nation.
 Lieutenant Colonel Everett Ernest Blakely USAF: B-17 Pilot in WW II. Received this medal after a bombing mission to Trondheim, Norway.
 Lieutenant Colonel Louis Edward Curdes USAAF: Recipient of two DFCs. One of only three American WW II pilots to shoot down German, Italian and Japanese planes. He also intentionally shot down an American plane.
 Lieutenant Colonel George A. Davis, USAF: high-scoring Korean War ace.
 Lieutenant Colonel Bill Harris (aviator) USAF: WW2 Triple ace fighter pilot. 
 Lieutenant Colonel Michael J. Novosel, USAFR: Vietnam War helicopter pilot, Medal of Honor recipient, three DFCs.
 Lieutenant Colonel Robert S. Johnson, USAFR: recipient of nine DFCs.
 Lieutenant Colonel Arthur W. Murray, USAF: early jet test pilot.
 Lieutenant Colonel Dick Rutan, USAF: piloted first unrefueled non-stop around the world flight.  Recipient of five DFCs.
 Lieutenant Colonel Albert William Stevens, USAAF: participant in both the Explorer I and Explorer II stratospheric balloon flights.
 Lieutenant Colonel Boyd Wagner, USAAC: first Army Air Corps ace of World War II.
 Lieutenant Colonel Ray Shuey Wetmore, USAAF: 21 aerial victories during World War II. Received six DFCs.
 Lieutenant Colonel Gerald O. Young, USAF: Vietnam War helicopter pilot.
 Lieutenant Colonel Jay Zeamer Jr., USAF: World War II Medal of Honor recipient.
 Lieutenant Colonel Dan "Two Dogs" Hampton, USAF: received four DFC's as a "Wild Weasel" surface-to-air missile killer. 
 Major Richard Bong, USAAF: highest-scoring American ace of World War II.
 Major Horace S. Carswell Jr., USAAF: World War II bomber pilot.
 Major George Andrew Davis Jr., USAF: Ace in both World War II and the Korean War. Four DFCs.
 Major Charles J. Loring Jr., USAF: World War II POW and Korean War F-80 Shooting Star pilot.
 Major Thomas McGuire, USAAF: second highest-scoring American ace in World War II with 38 kills. Six DFCs.
 Major John Trevor Godfrey, USAAF: shot down 18 German aircraft.
 Major Louis J. Sebille, USAF: Korean War F-51 Mustang pilot, two DFCs.
 Major Joseph Thompson Jr., USAAF: Aerial reconnaissance pilot with 90 missions, most behind enemy lines.
 Major MJ Hegar, USAF:  Second female recipient during combat search and rescue mission in Afghanistan.
 Major George Welch, USAAF: one of the few American fighter pilots to get airborne during the attack on Pearl Harbor.
 Captain Alan "Ace" Cozzalio, US Army: helicopter pilot, (4, 3 Oak leaf clusters)
 Captain Kenneth H. Dahlberg, USAAF: business executive and figure in the Watergate scandal, recipient of two DFCs.
 Captain Joseph Elsberry, Member of the Tuskegee Airmen. Destroyed three enemy aircraft over France in a single mission on July 12, 1944, and a fourth aircraft on July 20, 1944, becoming the first African American fighter pilot to do so.
 Captain Hawthorne C. Gray, USAAC: died during altitude record breaking balloon ascent in 1927.
 Captain Joseph Kittinger, USAF: seven DFCs, served three tours in Vietnam and holder of the highest free-fall parachute jump record for 52 years. 
 Captain Ken Kavanaugh, USAAF: Professional football player.
 Captain Thomas Mantell, KYANG: died in pursuit of a UFO.
 Captain Francis Gary Powers, USAF: captured by Soviets when his U-2 spy plane was shot down in 1960.
 Captain Edward L. Toppins, member of the famed Red Tails/Tuskegee Airmen with 4 confirmed aerial kills.
 Captain John S. Walmsley Jr., USAF: Korean War B-26 pilot.
 Captain Hilliard A. Wilbanks, USAF: Vietnam War O-1 pilot and Medal of Honor recipient.
 Captain Louis Zamperini, USAAF: POW during World War II. Inspiration for the movie Unbroken.
 First Lieutenant John Ehrlichman, USAAF: B-17 navigator, presidential aide and figure in the Watergate scandal.
 First Lieutenant Bob Hoover, USAAF: POW and record breaking pilot.
 First Lieutenant Raymond L. Knight, USAAF: World War II P-47 pilot.
 First Lieutenant Aleda E. Lutz, USAAF: World War II Army flight nurse.
 First Lieutenant Mary Louise Hawkins, USAAF: World War II Army evacuation flight nurse.
 First Lieutenant Donald D. Pucket, USAAF: died during Operation Tidal Wave.
 2nd Lieutenant Dean Cullom Smith, USAACR: pilot for Admiral Byrd's 1928 to 1930 Antarctic Expedition.
 Chief Master Sergeant Duane D. Hackney, USAF: recipient of four DFCs.
 Technical Sergeant Ben Kuroki, USAAF: Japanese-American veteran of 58 combat missions.

United States Marine Corps
 General Earl E. Anderson, USMC: Assistant Commandant of the Marine Corps.
 General Keith B. McCutcheon, USMC
 General Christian F. Schilt, USMC: director of Marine Corps Aviation.
 Lieutenant General Frank E. Petersen, USMC: first African-American Marine Corps general.
 Lieutenant General William G. Thrash, USMC
 Major General John P. Condon, USMC
 Major General Marion Eugene Carl, USMC: first Marine Corps ace.  Recipient of five DFCs.
 Major General Ross "Rusty" Rowell, USMC: 1927 Nicaragua, carried out the first coordinated dive-bombing attacks in aviation history.
 Brigadier General Joe Foss: Medal of Honor recipient, second highest scoring Marine Corps ace of World War II and Governor of South Dakota.
 Brigadier General Robert E. Galer, USMC: commanded VMF-224 on Guadalcanal.
 Colonel Kenneth L. Reusser, USMC: recipient of two DFCs.  Had 253 combat missions in World War II, Korea and Vietnam.
 Colonel Archie Van Winkle, USMC: World War II, Korean War and Vietnam War veteran.
 Colonel Jefferson J. DeBlanc, USMC: shot down five planes in a single day.
 Colonel John Lucian Smith, USMC: leader of the Cactus Air Force on Guadalcanal.
 Colonel James E. Swett, USMC: shot down 5 planes on his first combat mission and recipient of eight DFCs.
 Lieutenant Colonel John F. Bolt, USMC: Only Marine jet fighter ace. Only Naval Aviator to achieve ace status in two wars (WWII and Korea.)
 Major William H. May, USMC: FAA Pioneer, recipient of seven DFCs.
 Major Robert Claude Maze, USMC
 Major Stephen W. Pless, USMC
 Captain Donald N. Aldrich, USMC: 20 kills.
 Captain Cecil A. Alexander Jr., USMCR: modern architect. Recipient of two DFCs during World War II.
 Captain Charles S. Whitehouse, USMC: diplomat, CIA officer and recipient of seven DFCs.
 First Lieutenant Robert M. Hanson, USMC: member of the Black Sheep Squadron with 25 kills.

United States Navy
 Admiral Stan Arthur, USN: Vice Chief of Naval Operations and recipient of 11 DFCs.
 Admiral Thomas B. Hayward, USN: Chief of Naval Operations.
 Admiral James L. Holloway III, USN: Chief of Naval Operations.
 Admiral Thomas H. Moorer, USN: Chairman of the Joint Chiefs of Staff.
 Admiral Huntington Hardisty, USN: Commander in Chief of United States Pacific Command.
 Vice Admiral Walter E. Carter Jr., USN: president of the United States Naval War College and superintendent of the United States Naval Academy.
 Vice Admiral John T. Hayward, USN: president of the United States Naval War College.
 Vice Admiral Diego E. Hernández, USN: vice commander of NORAD.
 Vice Admiral Edward H. Martin, USN: POW for over five years.
 Vice Admiral James B. Stockdale, USN: Medal of Honor recipient, POW in Vietnam, president of the United States Naval War College and vice presidential candidate.
 Rear Admiral Richard E. Byrd, USN: Medal of Honor recipient, organized and led first flights over the north and south poles.
 Rear Admiral Jeremiah Denton, USN: Navy Cross recipient, POW in Vietnam for seven and a half years.
 Rear Admiral Wade McClusky, USN: hero of the Battle of Midway.
 Captain Michael J. Estocin, USN: Medal of Honor recipient, missing in action in the Vietnam War.
 Captain Cecil E. Harris, USN: second highest scoring Navy ace with 24 kills.  Recipient of three DFCs.
 Captain David McCampbell, USN: Medal of Honor recipient, top US Navy ace of World War II.
 Captain Royce Williams, USN: ace fighter pilot during the Vietnam War, awarded two DFCs.
 Commander Everett Alvarez Jr., USN: POW in Vietnam for eight years and seven months.
 Commander Stephen Coonts, USNR: Vietnam War veteran, lawyer and author.
 Commander Eugene A. Valencia Jr., USNR: 23 aerial victories in World War II, awarded five DFCs.
 Lieutenant Commander Ira C. Kepford, USNR: 16 aerial victories in World War II.
 Lieutenant Commander Edward "Butch" O'Hare, USN: shot down 3 Japanese bombers and damaged two others on a single flight. Two DFCs.
 Lieutenant Commander George Otto Noville, USNR: flew on second non-stop trans-Atlantic flight with Richard E. Byrd.
 Lieutenant Commander Richard Halsey Best, USN : the first pilot to successfully bomb two Japanese carriers, the Akagi and the Hiryu, in one day
 Lieutenant Harold June, USN: co-pilot of first flight over the South Pole.
 Lieutenant Joseph P. Kennedy Jr., USNR: Navy Cross recipient and brother of President John F. Kennedy.
 Lieutenant Dieter Dengler, USN: Navy Cross recipient.
 Ensign Jesse L. Brown, USNR: first African-American naval aviator.

United States Coast Guard
 Vice Admiral John Currier USCG

United States Army
 General of the Army Douglas MacArthur: Medal of Honor recipient, Chief of Staff of the United States Army (1930–1935), commander of the Southwest Pacific Area (1942–1945) and commander of United Nations forces in Korea (1950–1951). DFC awarded for supervising and observing in person the Sukchon-Sunchon airborne operation north of Pyongyang.
 General Alexander Haig, USA: NATO Supreme Allied Commander for Europe and Secretary of State.
 General Wayne A. Downing, USA: commander of United States Special Operations Command.
 General John W. Foss, USA: combat veteran of Vietnam and Commander United States Army Training and Doctrine Command
 General Frederick M. Franks Jr., USA: commander of VII Corps during Operation Desert Storm.
 General John Galvin, USA: NATO Supreme Allied Commander for Europe.
 General Frederick Kroesen, USA: combat veteran of World War II, Korea and Vietnam and commander of 7th United States Army.
 General Gary E. Luck, USA: commander, United States Forces Korea.
 General Edward C. Meyer, USA: Chief of Staff of the United States Army.
 General Dennis J. Reimer, USA: Chief of Staff of the United States Army.
 General Roscoe Robinson Jr., USA: first African-American US Army four star general.
 General Bernard W. Rogers, USA: Chief of Staff of the United States Army and Supreme Allied Commander for NATO.
 General Norman Schwarzkopf, USA: commander of Operation Desert Storm.
 General Donn A. Starry, USA: commander of the United States Army Training and Doctrine Command.
 General Sam S. Walker, USA: son of General Walton Walker and superintendent of the Virginia Military Institute.
 General Walton Walker, USA: commander of the 8th Army in Korea and recipient of two DFCs.
 General Melvin Zais, USA: commander of the 101st Airborne Division in Vietnam.
 Lieutenant General Edward Almond, USA: commanded X Corps during the Korean War.
 Lieutenant General Hobart R. Gay, USA: commanded the 1st Cavalry Division in the Korean War.
 Lieutenant General David E. Grange, USA: combat veteran of World War II, Korea and Vietnam and commander of the Sixth United States Army.
 Lieutenant General James F. Hollingsworth, USA: combat veteran of World War II and Vietnam. Recipient of three DFCs.
 Lieutenant General Thomas Tackaberry, USA: combat veteran of Korea and Vietnam and commander of the XVIII Airborne Corps.
 Major General Patrick Henry Brady, USA: Vietnam War helicopter pilot.
 Major General George Patton IV, USA: Son of General George S. Patton.
 Colonel Bruce P. Crandall, USA: Vietnam War helicopter pilot. 
 Colonel David Hackworth, USA: highly decorated Army officer, commentator and author.
 Lieutenant Colonel Bo Gritz, USA: highly decorated Special Forces officer in Vietnam.
 Lieutenant Colonel John Paul Vann, USA: military advisor in Vietnam.
 Major Lauri Törni, USA: Veteran of the Finnish Army, Waffen SS during World War II and U.S. Army Special Forces in Vietnam.
 Chief Warrant Officer Richard McCoy Jr., USA:  Vietnam veteran and aircraft hijacker.
 Command Sergeant Major Silas L. Copeland, USA: Sergeant Major of the Army.

See also
 Distinguished Flying Cross (United Kingdom)
 Inter-service decorations of the United States military

References

Further reading

External links

 The Distinguished Flying Cross Society
 Texas Military Veteran Video Oral Histories Digital Collection - Veterans Awarded the Distinguished Flying Cross -- Newton Gresham Library, Sam Houston State University

Awards established in 1926
Courage awards
Military awards and decorations of the United States
Awards and decorations of the United States Air Force
Awards and decorations of the United States Army
Awards and decorations of the United States Coast Guard
Awards and decorations of the United States Marine Corps
Awards and decorations of the United States Navy
Awards and decorations of the United States Space Force
Recipients of the Distinguished Flying Cross (United States)